He Wanted Work is a 1914 American silent comedy film featuring Oliver Hardy.

Plot

Cast
 John Edwards as John Jackson
 Mattie Edwards as Mandy
 Billy Bowers as The Boss
 Oliver Hardy as The Foreman (as Babe Hardy)

See also
 List of American films of 1914
 Oliver Hardy filmography

External links

1914 films
1914 short films
American silent short films
American black-and-white films
1914 comedy films
Lost American films
Films directed by Arthur Hotaling
Silent American comedy films
American comedy short films
1914 lost films
Lost comedy films
1910s American films